Salinella salve is a dubious species of a very simple animal that may not exist, but which some have named as the sole member of the phylum Monoblastozoa. It was discovered in 1892 by Johannes Frenzel in the salt pans of Argentina and cultivated in a laboratory by him. This animal has not been found since and its real existence is considered as doubtful. Michael Schrödl from the Zoological State Collection in Munich is involved in a project to search for Salinella in Argentina.

Monoblastozoa was granted the title of phylum after the recognition that Mesozoa was too diverse to be a phylum into itself.

Description 
According to Frenzel's description, S. salve is more organized than Protozoa, but still very primitive for a multicellular organism. They are characterised by their distinct anterior/posterior parts and being densely ciliated, especially around the "mouth" and "anus". They have only one layer of cells, and reproduce asexually by transverse fission of their bodies. Although sexual reproduction was suspected, Frenzel did not observe it.

See also 
 Mesotardigrada – another high rank taxon whose sole member has not been independently verified to exist

References

External links 
 
 

Obsolete animal taxa
Nomina dubia
Monotypic animal genera